The accession of Montenegro to the North Atlantic Treaty Organization, or NATO, took place on 5 June 2017. In December 2009, Montenegro was granted a Membership Action Plan, the final step in an application for membership in the organization. A formal invitation was issued by the alliance on 2 December 2015, with accession negotiations concluded with the signature by the Foreign Ministers of an Accession Protocol on 19 May 2016. Montenegro officially joined NATO on 5 June 2017.

Background 
The State Union of Serbia and Montenegro applied to NATO's Partnership for Peace (PfP) program in June 2003. Montenegro declared independence on 3 June 2006 and soon after opened a Permanent Mission to NATO in Brussels. The new country subsequently joined PfP at the 2006 Riga summit. In November 2007, Montenegro signed a transit agreement with NATO, allowing the alliance's troops to move across the country. Montenegro then signed an agreement with the United States, in which Montenegro would destroy its outdated weaponry as a precondition for NATO membership. In late 2007, Montenegro's Defense Minister Boro Vučinić said that Montenegro would intensify its accession to the alliance after the 2008 Bucharest summit. Montenegro entered Intensified Dialogue with NATO in April 2008, and adopted an Individual Partnership Action Plan in June 2008. It was invited to join the Adriatic Charter of NATO aspirants on 25 September 2008. The country then applied for a Membership Action Plan on 5 November 2008 with support of Prime Minister Milo Đukanović, which was granted in December 2009. Montenegro also began full membership with the Adriatic Charter of NATO aspirants in May 2009.

Montenegro began to contribute its national armed forces to NATO foreign military operations. The country deployed 40 soldiers, a three-member military medical team, and two officers under German command to Afghanistan in 2010. Montenegrin peacekeepers were also deployed to Liberia and Somalia.

Montenegro has received support for its membership bid from several NATO countries, including Romania, Turkey, Germany and the United States.

In December 2013, Dnevne Novine reported that NATO had decided that Montenegro would join NATO at the same time as Macedonia, whose membership has been vetoed by Greece over the Macedonia naming dispute, making accession unlikely in 2014.

In March 2014, Montenegrin Prime Minister Milo Đukanović stated the desire for Montenegro to join NATO, and in May 2014 expressed the hopes an invitation to join the organization will be favoured at the 2014 NATO summit in September.  Russian MP Mikhail Degtyarev of the nationalist LDPR warned that NATO membership would make Montenegro "a legitimate target of Russian missiles."

On 29 May 2014, the Slovenian (Karel Erjavec & Roman Jakič) and Croatian (Vesna Pusić & Ante Kotromanović) foreign and defense ministers sent a letter to the Secretary General of NATO, stressing the importance of inviting Montenegro into NATO. The Slovene defense minister also stated that he expects Montenegro to receive a NATO invitation during NATO's 2014 Summit in Wales. However, later that year NATO announced that it would not be offering any new countries membership into the organization that year. Analysts confirmed this as a sign that NATO members are becoming skeptical about further Eastern expansion following Russia's annexation of Crimea, due to worries about Russian retaliation to new security guarantees to countries so close to its borders.

In June 2014, then NATO secretary-general Anders Fogh Rasmussen suggested that NATO would open "intensified talks" with the aim of inviting Montenegro to join the alliance by the end of 2015, but that Montenegro would not get an invitation to join the NATO summit in September. Further assessment of Montenegro's progress was expected by the end of 2015.

A formal invitation was issued by the alliance on 2 December 2015. Final accession talks began in February 2016, and concluded in May, allowing Montenegro to take an "observer" status pending ratification by the governments of the other members, as well as by Montenegro's own parliament.

Pro-Russian opposition parties argued that a referendum on NATO membership should be held simultaneously to parliamentary elections in October 2016, though the government suggested that the elections were a de facto plebiscite on the issue. Pro-NATO parties advanced in the election result.

The United States Senate voted on the Resolution of Ratification (Resolution of Advice and Consent to Ratification (Treaty Doc. 114-12)) on 28 March 2017. President Donald Trump signed a presidential memorandum on 11 April 2017. Ratification by each member state was completed with Spain's ratification on 10 May. On 28 April 2017 Montenegro's parliament ratified the accession treaty. Montenegro officially joined NATO as a member state on 5 June 2017.

The reaction of the Russian government to Montenegro's bid to join NATO had been increasingly hostile culminating in an attempt to stage a coup d'état on 16 October 2016, on the day of the parliamentary election that allegedly would have included assassination of Montenegro's prime minister Milo Đukanović, according to the statements made by Montenegrin officials. The coup plot involved Russian nationals, including a Russian military intelligence officer previously expelled from Poland. Tensions between the countries went on unabated thereafter.

Opinion polls

According to a government poll in March 2014, 46 percent of Montenegro's populace supported NATO membership, while 42 percent opposed it. A poll in July 2015 from the Centre for Democracy and Human Rights, which receives financial support from NATO, found that 36.6 percent support membership, to 37.3 percent against, with sharp divisions between ethnic groups: 71.2 percent of Montenegrin Albanians and 68 percent of Montenegrin Bosniaks support membership, while only 11.3 percent of Montenegrin Serbs do. Russian MP Mikhail Degtyarev of the Nationalist LDPR threatened in May 2014 that NATO membership would make Montenegro "a legitimate target of Russian missiles."

Political views
The ruling Democratic Party of Socialists of Montenegro and Social Democratic Party of Montenegro maintain a strong desire for Montenegro to become a NATO member state. In early 2009 they launched a two-year campaign with the aim of promoting accession to NATO, which is handled by the MAPA media agency under theatrical director Radmila Vojvodić. The ruling coalition of PM Milo Đukanović claims Montenegro cannot afford to remain neutral and identifies NATO and the EU as a common process of Euro-Atlantic integrations. According to a demographic breakdown of polling, citizens of pro-Serbian or pro-Russian political orientation, Eastern Orthodox Christian conservatives, women and the undereducated are the main groups that do not support NATO membership. The campaign has been somewhat successful, but received criticism from the Nansen Dialogue Centre for significant financial investment in a biased and propagandist campaign during a recession. As a direct response, the establishment of the  group launched the "No to NATO!" campaign, on a much smaller scale.

The memory of NATO's 1999 bombing campaign of the then Federal Republic of Yugoslavia and resulting civilian casualties form a crucial part of the opposition to NATO membership in Montenegro.

The leading opposition political party, the Socialist People's Party of Montenegro, has remained ambiguous on the question of NATO membership. Although strong supporters of European integration, they maintain that EU and NATO integrations are completely separate paths and endorse holding a referendum. SNP CG has generally avoided giving a direct answer, but it is indirectly opposed to NATO membership. The New Serb Democracy is an outspoken opponent of NATO membership, supporting a referendum and convinced there would be a negative outcome. The Movement for Changes is completely neutral and supports holding a referendum, and acknowledging its result. According to Strategic Marketing's poll on the question as to whether to schedule a referendum, 72% of respondents support holding it. CATI's poll from 11–15 December 2009 on the question of its result yielded the following: 44% would vote against it, 40% would vote in favor, while 8% is unsure.  According to a poll released in October 2009, 31.2% of Montenegro's populace supported NATO membership, while 44% opposed it. A poll by Ipsos in March 2014 found that 46% supported membership versus 42% who were opposed. A December 2015 poll found support at 47%, opposition at 39%, with the remaining 14% undecided.

Opposition parties, including Socialist People's Party of Montenegro, have argued that membership should be approved in a national referendum. A political crisis followed the government's announcement of intention to join NATO; large protests, supported by pro-Serbian parties, were held in Podgorica in mid-October 2015 that culminated in a riot in the capital on 24 October.  Đukanović accused Serbia and Russia of supporting.

A split in the ruling coalition followed in January 2016.

NATO membership was an issue of debate during the October 2016 parliamentary election. The Democratic Party of Socialists, which had governed Montenegro since 1991 and supports membership, won the election with 41% of the popular vote.

Ratification timeline

Full membership
Montenegro became the 29th member of NATO on 5 June 2017 when it deposited its instrument of accession to the North Atlantic Treaty with the U.S. State Department in Washington, D.C. On 7 June 2017, The Flag of Montenegro was raised at NATO Headquarters in a special ceremony to mark the country's accession to NATO. Flag raising ceremonies were also held simultaneously at Allied Command Operations in Mons and Allied Command Transformation in Norfolk, Virginia.

See also

 Foreign relations of Montenegro
 Accession of Montenegro to the European Union

References

External links
NATO's relations with Montenegro

Foreign relations of Montenegro
National security of Montenegro
NATO relations
Montenegro and NATO